The Norwegian surnames Haaland  and Håland may refer to the following people:

Sports

Football 
 Alfie Haaland (born 1972), Norwegian footballer
 Atle Roar Håland (born 1977), Norwegian footballer
 Benedicte Håland (born 1998), Norwegian footballer
 Erling Haaland (born 2000), Norwegian footballer; son of Alfie Haaland

Skiing 
 Lars Haaland (born 1962), Swedish cross-country skier

Politicians 
 Christian Wegner Haaland (1892–1952), Norwegian ship-owner and politician
 Deb Haaland (born 1960), American politician
 Thomas Vigner Christiansen Haaland (1859–1913), Norwegian banker, politician
 Thomas Wegner Larsen Haaland (1862–1935), Norwegian banker, politician, farmer

Other 
 Bjøro Håland (born 1943),  Norwegian country singer
 Bret Haaland (born 1964), American animation director
 Jan Haaland (born 1956), Norwegian School of Economics and Business Administration rector
 Janne Haaland Matláry (born 1957), Norwegian professor for political science and author
 Karine Haaland (born 1966), Norwegian cartoonist
 Reidar Haaland (1919–1945), Norwegian police officer executed for treason

See also 
 Haaland v. Brackeen, US Supreme Court case
 Halland

Norwegian-language surnames